The Seven Arts Shop, is a one-story, wood-frame Tudor Storybook retail shop in Carmel-by-the-Sea, California. It has been designated as a significant commercial building in the city's Downtown Historic District Property Survey, and was recorded with the Department of Parks and Recreation on January 23, 2002. The building is occupied in 2022 by the beauty supply company Body Frenzy.

History

The Seven Arts Shop is a one-story, cement stucco, wood-frame Tudor Revival Storybook retail shop. It has a steep pitched side-gabled roof, circular turrets, a chimney, colorful tiles placed in the stucco above the windows, and a front Dutch door. The building is in front of the Court of the Golden Bough on Ocean Avenue and Monte Verde Street, and next to the Carmel Weavers Studio, also known as Cottage of Sweets. It was designed by theatrical producer Edward G. Kuster. Kuster's design is based on inspiration from illustrations of Swedish folk tales of Edmund Dulac. He commissioned Michael J. Murphy to build in September 1923.

Originally, the shop was constructed as "The Seven Arts" book and art store for Helena Conger and Herbert Heron. Ads appeared for books, artwork, typewriters, ornamental iron works and lamp fixtures were produced by the Santa Cruz artist, “Otar the Lampmaker." In September 1925, The Seven Arts store moved to the Seven Arts Building on Ocean Avenue and Lincoln Street. The Seven Arts Shop on Ocean Avenue and Monte Verde Street became a Christian Science Reading room in 1936, and Robert Talbot Ties in 1987. 

Heron commissioned shops and offices around the courtyard. The businesses were associated with the "Seven Arts," which included: music, dancing, literature, painting, sculpture, and architecture. The Seven Arts Shop was Heron's bookshop and printing press, the Seven Arts Press, and The Carmelite (1928-1932) newspaper, which published about art, music, and culture. 

The building qualifies for inclusion in the Downtown Historic District Property Survey because it is one of the early commercial "Old Europe" shops in the Golden Bough Court, designed and funded by theatrical producer and lawyer Edward G. Kuster, and built to compliment the Theatre of the Golden Bough. It continues to contribute to the character of the downtown historic district.

Carmel writer Daisy Bostick noted in an April 4, 1924 article for the Carmel Pine Cone that, "In Carmel-by-the-Sea, on Ocean avenue, there is a group of little shops that might well be transferred to an artist's canvas and labeled, A Bit of Old Europe." 

In 1926, Tirey L. Ford wrote a book about Monterey and talked about "A Bit Of Carmel," where he described Carmel's "Main Street," as:

See also
 Monterey Peninsula

References

External links

 Downtown Conservation District Historic Property Survey
 Office of Historic Preservation
 Mr. Bunt, published by Seven Arts Press

1923 establishments in California
Carmel-by-the-Sea, California
Buildings and structures in Monterey County, California